Julie Dickson,  was the Superintendent of the Office of the Superintendent of Financial Institutions of Canada, from July 4, 2007 to June, 2014. She later became a European Central Bank representative on the Supervisory Board of the Single Supervisory Mechanism, concerned with uniform regulatory oversight of European Banks.  The supervisory group, or "Single Supervisory Mechanism", is composed of the European Central Bank and the national supervisory authorities of participating countries.

As Superintendent, Dickson served on the Council of Governors of the Canadian Public Accountability Board, the board of directors of the Canada Deposit Insurance Corporation and the Toronto Leadership Centre board of directors. Dickson also represents the OSFI on the Financial Stability Board and was a member of the Basel Committee on Banking Supervision from 2002 to 2006.

Dickson received her masters degree in economics from Queen's University and a Bachelor of Arts (Honours Economics) from the University of New Brunswick. Dickson, a native of Saint John New Brunswick, graduated from Saint John High School in 1975.

She was awarded the Order of Canada with the grade of officer.

References

1950s births
Canadian civil servants
Living people
Queen's University at Kingston alumni
University of New Brunswick alumni
Officers of the Order of Canada